Vertigo gouldii, common name the variable vertigo, is a species of minute air-breathing land snail, a terrestrial pulmonate gastropod mollusk in the family Vertiginidae, the whorl snails. 

Subspecies
 Vertigo gouldii arizonensis Pilsbry & Vanatta, 1900
 Vertigo gouldii coloradoensis (Cockerell, 1891)
 Vertigo gouldii inserta Pilsbry, 1919

Distribution 
This species occurs in:
 Texas, USA.

References

 Binney, A. (1843). Critical notice of the species found in the United States, which, at present, are described as constituting the genus Pupa. Proceedings of the Boston Society of Natural History, 1: 104-106.
 Thompson, F. G. (2011). An annotated checklist and bibliography of the land and freshwater snails of México and Central America. Florida Museum of Natural History Bulletin. 50(1): 1-299
 Rosenberg, G. & Muratov, I. V. (2006). Status report on the terrestrial Mollusca of Jamaica. Proceedings of the Academy of Natural Sciences of Philadelphia. 155: 117-161; Erratum: 156: 401 (2007).

External links
 Cockerell, T. D. A. (1889). Preliminary remarks on the molluscan fauna of Colorado. Journal of Conchology. 6(1): 60-65.
 Pilsbry, H. A. & Vanatta, E. G. (1900). A partial revision of the Pupae of the United States. Proceedings of the Academy of Natural Sciences of Philadelphia. 52: 582-611, plates 22-23.
 Sterki, V. (1890). On some northern Pupidae, with descriptions of new species. The Nautilus. 3(11): 123-126

gouldii
Gastropods described in 1843